The 2019 British motorcycle Grand Prix was the twelfth round of the 2019 MotoGP season. It was held at the Silverstone Circuit in Silverstone on 25 August 2019. The race saw one of the closest finishes in the history of MotoGP, as Álex Rins won the race by just 0.013s ahead of Marc Márquez.

Classification

MotoGP

Moto2

 Enea Bastianini withdrew from the event due to foot pain from a crash at the previous round in Austria.

Moto3

Championship standings after the race

MotoGP

Moto2

Moto3

Notes

References

External links

British
Motorcycle Grand Prix
British motorcycle Grand Prix
British motorcycle Grand Prix